Gurbaksh Singh was an Indian novelist and short story writer.

Gurbaksh Singh may also refer to:

 Gurbaksh Singh Kanhaiya (1759 – 1785), father-in-law of Ranjit Singh founder of the Sikh Empire
 Gurbaksh Singh Khalsa (1965 – 2018), Indian Sikh civil rights activist
 Gurbaksh Singh Sandhu, Indian boxing coach
 Gurbakshish Singh (1911 – 1983), Indian politician from Punjab
 Gurbux Singh (born 1936), former field hockey player from India

See also